The London Conservative Party mayoral selection of 2007 was the process by which the Conservative Party selected its candidate for Mayor of London, to stand in the 2008 mayoral election. Member of Parliament Boris Johnson was selected to stand.

Selection process

The Mayoral candidate was selected via an Open primary that was open to all London voters who were on the electoral roll. Voters had to register to vote at a charge of £1.50.

Candidates

 Boris Johnson, Member of Parliament for Henley
 Victoria Borwick, Kensington and Chelsea London Borough Councillor
 Andrew Boff, former Hillingdon and Hackney London Borough Councillor
 Warwick Lightfoot, Kensington and Chelsea London Borough Councillor

Result

See also
2008 London mayoral election

References

Conservative Party (UK)
Mayoral elections in London
Conservative Party mayoral selection
London Conservative Party mayoral selection
London Conservative Party mayoral selection
Boris Johnson